Jeffrey Scott Springs (born September 20, 1992) is an American professional baseball pitcher for the Tampa Bay Rays of Major League Baseball (MLB). He previously played for the Texas Rangers and Boston Red Sox.

Career
Springs attended South Point High School in Belmont, North Carolina. He attended Appalachian State University, pursuing a degree in management and played college baseball for the Mountaineers for four years (2012–2015). Springs was drafted by the Texas Rangers in the 30th round of the 2015 MLB Draft and signed with them for a $1,000 signing bonus.

Texas Rangers
After signing, Springs split the season between the Spokane Indians and Hickory Crawdads. He posted a combined 2–2 record with a 2.61 ERA in 31 innings. He split the 2016 season between two levels, with the Hickory Crawdads going 1–1 with a 1.16 ERA in 18 games and struggling in a promotion to the High Desert Mavericks, going 2–2 with a 5.36 ERA in 13 games (9 starts}. Springs spent 2017 with the Down East Wood Ducks, going 2–8 with a 3.69 ERA with 146 strikeouts in  innings in 31 games (17 starts). Springs opened the 2018 season with the Frisco RoughRiders of the Texas League, producing a 3–2 record with a 4.82 ERA in  innings. Springs was promoted to the Round Rock Express of the Pacific Coast League, producing a 1–2 record with a 2.79 ERA in 19.1 innings.

Springs was promoted to the major leagues for the first time on July 31, 2018 and made his major league debut that night, striking out A.J. Pollock for his first major league strikeout. Springs finished his rookie season after producing a 1–1 record with a 3.38 ERA in 32 major league innings. In 2019, Springs made the Rangers opening day roster. Springs missed close to two months due to left biceps tendinitis. He finished the 2019 season going 4–1 with a 6.40 ERA over  innings for Texas. 

On December 2, 2019, Springs was designated for assignment. On December 13, Springs re-signed with Texas on a one-year major league contract.

Boston Red Sox
On January 15, 2020, Springs was traded to the Boston Red Sox in exchange for Sam Travis. On March 26, the team optioned Springs to the Triple-A Pawtucket Red Sox. Springs made his debut with Boston in the team's fourth game of the delayed-start  season, allowing five runs on four hits and a walk in  innings of relief against the New York Mets on July 27. He was optioned to and from the team's alternate training site during August and September. Overall with the 2020 Red Sox, Springs appeared in 16 games, all in relief, compiling an 0–2 record with 7.08 ERA and 28 strikeouts in  innings pitched. On February 16, 2021, Springs was designated for assignment by Boston following the signing of Hirokazu Sawamura.

Tampa Bay Rays
On February 17, 2021, the Red Sox traded Springs and Chris Mazza to the Tampa Bay Rays in exchange for Ronaldo Hernández and Nick Sogard. He made a career-high 43 appearances for Tampa Bay in 2021, pitching to a 5-1 record and 3.43 ERA with 63 strikeouts in 44.2 innings of work.On August 16, Springs underwent season-ending surgery to repair an ACL tear in his right knee and was placed on the 60-day injured list.

Springs made 33 appearances (25 of them starts) for the Rays in 2022, posting a 9-5 record and career-best 2.46 ERA while striking out 144 in 135.1 innings pitched.

On January 25, 2023, Springs agreed to a four-year, $31 million contract extension with the Rays.

References

External links

Appalachian State Mountaineers bio

1992 births
Living people
People from Belmont, North Carolina
Baseball players from North Carolina
Major League Baseball pitchers
Texas Rangers players
Boston Red Sox players
Tampa Bay Rays players
Appalachian State Mountaineers baseball players
Appalachian State University alumni
Arizona League Rangers players
Spokane Indians players
Hickory Crawdads players
High Desert Mavericks players
Down East Wood Ducks players
Frisco RoughRiders players
Round Rock Express players
Nashville Sounds players